Allan Maher (born 21 July 1950) is an Australian former soccer goalkeeper, who was part of Australia's squad for the 1974 FIFA World Cup.

Playing career
At club level, he was a part of the successful Marconi sides of the early National Soccer League years, where he was a member of their 1979 championship side.

While Maher was a member of Australia's 1974 FIFA World Cup squad, he didn't make his full international debut until 1975. He represented Australia in 22 A internationals between 1975 and 1981.

References

External links 

1950 births
Living people
Australian soccer players
Australia international soccer players
1974 FIFA World Cup players
Association football goalkeepers